The British Rail Class 01/5 designation (TOPS code) encompasses a variety of privately owned shunting locomotives that are passed to be operated on the British mainline railway system. The types of shunter issued numbers under this classification are generally designs which did not operate under British Rail or did not carry TOPS numbers.

All 01/5 locomotives are  gauge.

Preservation
At least four Class 01/5 registered locomotive have been preserved. Two being at Long Marston, with another in the German military colours.

Fleet details

References

01.5
Standard gauge locomotives of Great Britain